Jujun Junaidi (born 30 December 1998) is an Indonesian professional footballer who plays as a right winger for Liga 1 club RANS Nusantara.

Club career

RANS Nusantara
Jujun was signed for RANS Nusantara to play in Liga 2 in the 2021–22 season. He made his league debut on 21 November 2021 in a match against Dewa United at the Gelora Bung Karno Madya Stadium, Jakarta.

Career statistics

Club

Notes

Honours

Club
RANS Cilegon
 Liga 2 runner-up: 2021

References

External links
 Jujun Junaidi at Soccerway
 Jujun Junaidi at Liga Indonesia

1998 births
Living people
Sportspeople from Bandung
Sportspeople from West Java
Liga 1 (Indonesia) players
Liga 2 (Indonesia) players
RANS Nusantara F.C. players
Indonesian footballers
Association football forwards